Unity Temple is a Unitarian Universalist church in Oak Park, Illinois, and the home of the Unity Temple Unitarian Universalist Congregation. It was designed by the American architect Frank Lloyd Wright, and built between 1905 and 1908. Unity Temple is considered to be one of Wright's most important structures dating from the first decade of the twentieth century.  Because of its consolidation of aesthetic intent and structure through use of a single material, reinforced concrete, Unity Temple is considered by many architects to be the first modern building in the world. This idea became of central importance to the modern architects who followed Wright, such as Ludwig Mies van der Rohe, and even the post-modernists, such as Frank Gehry. In 2019, along with seven other buildings designed by Wright in the 20th century, Unity Temple was added to the UNESCO World Heritage List.

The Unitarian Universalist congregation that worships in Unity Temple was formed in 1871, and has no connection with Unity Church, a religious organization founded in 1889.

Background

In 1905, a lightning strike started a fire which destroyed the wood-framed Oak Park Unity Church, architect Frank Lloyd Wright was one of the many architects who vied for the commission, and was ultimately selected to design a new structure for the Universalist congregation of Oak Park, Illinois. The result was the Unity Temple. Wright was not only living in Oak Park but also came from a family of Unitarians, a faith that had many beliefs in common with Universalism. The congregation needed a space of worship, as well as a community room. There were several immediate problems that the architect had to work with in order to satisfy the client. The budget was $45,000, a modest amount even in the early 20th century. Building materials had to be inexpensive and as Wright said, “concrete is cheap.” The same concrete molds were used multiple times, as Wright had designed repeating walls with similar dimensions. Additionally, the building site stood on a busy street. And finally, the architect was expected to design not only the structure but also furniture and stained glass for the building. Charles E. Roberts, an engineer, inventor and an important early client of Frank Lloyd Wright, served on the church's building committee and was a key figure in seeing that Wright's vision for the church became a reality. For Roberts, Wright also remodeled Roberts' home and the Charles E. Roberts Stable.

Design and construction

To accommodate the needs of the congregation, Wright divided the community space from the temple space through a low, middle loggia that could be approached from either side. This was an efficient use of space and kept down on noise between the two main gathering areas: those coming for religious services would be separated via the loggia from those coming for community events. The plan of Wright's design looks back to the bipartite design of his own studio built several blocks away in 1898: with two portions of the building similar in composition and separated by a lower passageway, and one section being larger than the other (the Guggenheim Museum in New York City is another bipartite design). Also for the Temple's architecture, Wright borrowed several attributes from his previous creation, the Larkin Administration Building. Key features derived were use of stained glass windows as well as geometric figure. But, unlike the Larkin Building, the Temple's plan produced a perfect square, as opposed to the double-square rectangle of the Larkin.

To reduce noise from the street, Wright eliminated street level windows in the temple. Instead, natural light comes from stained glass windows in the roof and clerestories along the upper walls. Because the members of the parish would not be able to look outside, Unity Temple's stained glass was designed with green, yellow, and brown tones in order to evoke the colors of nature. The main floor of the temple rises a few steps above the main level of the building (which has seating space), and the room also has two balconies for the seating of the congregation. These varying seating levels allowed the architect to design a building to fit the size of the congregation, but efficiently: no one person in the congregation is more than 40 feet from the pulpit. Wright also designed the building with very good acoustics.

The design of Unity Temple represents a leap forward in design for Wright. In recounting his experiences with Unity Temple, he stated that this design was the first time he ever realized that the real heart of a building is its space, not its walls. Indeed, architectural historians have commented on Wright's genius in creating and manipulating space in his designs; in his book The Master Builders, Peter Blake entitled the section on Wright "The Mastery of Space."

In addition to being very accomplished with making the most out of the space he had, Wright also found the concept of "Unity" was very prominent mainly because of how he managed to fuse together space, experience and the material world. This was key to Unity Temple which has both a common meeting area and the congregation of church-goers. The sanctuary space gives the best example of this according  to practicing architect Robert McCarter.

The building was completed in 1908 and officially dedicated on September 26, 1909.

Significance
The building has been a United States National Historic Landmark since December 30, 1970 and was chosen in a 1991 poll in the magazine, Architectural Record as one of the 100 most significant buildings in the United States of the previous 100 years (Unity Temple was #14). Additionally, Unity Temple was chosen by the American Institute of Architects as one of 17 buildings by Frank Lloyd Wright  that should be retained as his architectural contribution to American culture.

In 2008, the U.S. National Park Service submitted Unity Temple, along with nine other Frank Lloyd Wright properties, to a tentative list for World Heritage Status. The 10 sites have been submitted as one, total, site. The January 22, 2008 press release from the National Park Service website announcing the nominations states that, "The preparation of a Tentative List is a necessary first step in the process of nominating a site to the World Heritage List." After revised proposals, the properties were inscribed on the World Heritage List under the title "The 20th-Century Architecture of Frank Lloyd Wright" in July 2019.

Restoration 
A drawback to the modern design of the Unity Temple is structural problems that have emerged over time. Through the years of its existence, the Unity Temple's concrete structure has suffered extensive water damage. Pieces of the roof fell inside the structure, and water eroded other parts of the exterior, as well.

The original Universalist (now Unitarian Universalist) congregation  still uses Unity Temple, although a separate and secular organization, the Unity Temple Restoration Foundation  is in charge of the building's multimillion-dollar restoration effort.  The foundation and church developed a restoration plan over many years, beginning in 2000. In April 2009, Unity Temple, due to water seepage, was added to the National Trust for Historic Preservation's 11 most endangered historic places.

Chicago restoration architect Gunny Harboe was in charge of the restoration with CTLGroup providing the engineering and materials technology expertise. In April 2015, a $25 million interior and exterior restoration began. The restoration focused on structural improvements such as replacing the majority of the building's 16 separate flat roofs. The restoration also addressed decorative and environmental improvements to the building. Unity Temple closed to the public in June 2015.

Restoration work was completed in June 2017 and the building reopened for tours as of July 1, 2017. The building is closed to tours on Sundays, when the Unitarian Universalist church that calls the building home has its day of worship, but offers tours on other days of the week. The Unity Temple Restoration Foundation offers a full calendar of artistic and educational programming.

In 2018, the restoration of the temple received an award for excellence by the American Institute of Architects, Chicago chapter, and in 2019 was awarded the Urban Land Institute - Chicago Vision Award for historic restoration.

See also
 Unitarian Universalist Association
 List of Frank Lloyd Wright works
 Unitarian Meeting House, Shorewood Hills, Wisconsin

References
 Peter Blake, The Master Builders: Le Corbusier, Mies van der Rohe, Frank Lloyd Wright. New York: Norton, 1960. Reprint, 1976.
 Neil Levine, The Architecture of Frank Lloyd Wright. Princeton, NJ: Princeton University Press, 1993.
 William Allin Storrer. The Frank Lloyd Wright Companion. University of Chicago Press, 2006,  (S.096)

Notes

External links

 Unity Temple Unitarian Universalist Congregation is the congregation that still owns and uses the building.
Unity Temple Restoration Foundation collaborated with the Unity Temple Unitarian Congregation to restore Unity Temple. The foundation, along with the church itself, has a role in the management of the building. (The building is closed to the public on Sundays, as the structure is in use by the church on that day.) 
Wright on the Web: A Virtual Look at the Works of Frank Lloyd Wright is an independent website dedicated to the architecture of Frank Lloyd Wright, and has a page highlighting the seventeen buildings by Frank Lloyd Wright that were chosen by the American Institute of Architects as examples of his contribution to American culture.
Historic American Buildings Survey gallery of photos and drawings
Great building online: Unity Temple
High-resolution 360° Panoramas and Images of Unity Temple | Art Atlas

Frank Lloyd Wright buildings
Buildings and structures on the National Register of Historic Places in Cook County, Illinois
Churches on the National Register of Historic Places in Illinois
Churches completed in 1908
Ridgeland-Oak Park Historic District
20th-century Unitarian Universalist church buildings
Oak Park, Illinois
National Historic Landmarks in Illinois
Museums in Cook County, Illinois
History museums in Illinois
Religious museums in Illinois
Architecture museums in the United States
Unitarian Universalist churches in Illinois